Mike Mesaros may refer to:

 Mike Mesaros (musician), bass and vocalist of The Smithereens
 Mihalj Mesaroš (1935–2017), Yugoslav footballer